Jhinjhak railway station is a station in Jhinjhak in Kanpur Dehat District, Uttar Pradesh, India. It lies on (NCR)/North Central Railway line. Nearest station to east is Rura at a distance 19 km and Kanpur is at 63 km. In the west nearest station is Phaphund and Etawah.

Railway stations in Kanpur Dehat district
Allahabad railway division